Shambhu Nath was an Indian politician.  He was elected to the Lok Sabha, the lower house of the Parliament of India from the Saidpur, Uttar Pradesh as a member of the Indian National Congress.

References

External links
 Official Biographical Sketch in Lok Sabha Website

1928 births
Possibly living people
Indian National Congress politicians from Uttar Pradesh
India MPs 1967–1970
India MPs 1971–1977